Ma'an (also spelled Maan) is a town in northern Syria, administratively part of the Hama Governorate, located north of Hama. Nearby localities include Suran to the southwest, Murik to the northwest, al-Tamaanah to the north, Atshan to the northeast, Tuleisa to the east, Fan al-Shamali to the southeast and Kawkab to the south. According to the Syria Central Bureau of Statistics, Ma'an had a population of 1,561 in the 2004 census. Its inhabitants are predominantly Alawites.

In late December 2012, during the Syrian civil war, Islamist rebel fighters from the al-Nusra Front took over large parts of the town as part of a wider offensive in the Hama Governorate. During the battle, 11 rebels and 20 Syrian Army soldiers were killed. It was the site of the Maan massacre in 2014. On October 13, 2016 the town was liberated by the Syrian Arab Army.

References

Populated places in Hama District
Alawite communities in Syria